The Ultimate Blackjack Tour was a televised series of Elimination Blackjack tournaments that aired in syndication. It debuted on September 16, 2006. The show consists of a series of televised Elimination Blackjack tournaments. The winner of each weekly tournament returns for the final Tournament of Champions.

Along with professional blackjack players and Internet qualifiers, the producers included a number of professional poker players not normally known for playing blackjack to draw attention to the poker elements inherent in the unique format of Elimination Blackjack tournaments.

The show was executive produced by Houston Curtis and his production company with additional EP's, Jon Moonves and Sam Korkis.  UBT was hosted by Max Rubin and Mati Moralejo, with Nikki Ziering and Shandi Finnessey serving as sideline reporters. Nikki Ziering did not return for the second season. Anthony Curtis conducted the analysis of all hands shown and wrote the commentary.

Featured players of the Ultimate Blackjack Tour are members of Team UBT, which is made up of poker stars like Johnny Chan, Robert Williamson III, and Phil Laak and professional blackjack players like world champions Ken Einiger and Anthony Curtis, Mike Aponte, James Grosjean, "Hollywood" Dave Stann and Monica Reeves.

Season 1
The first season consisted of ten televised tournaments. The winner of each of seven preliminary tournaments returned for the final Tournament of Champions. Players competed for a share of over $1 million. Two of the episodes, "Ladies' Night" and the "UBT Legends Tournament," were not qualifiers for the Tournament of Champions.

Tournament results

1 Not a qualifier tournament for the Season 1 Championship table

Season 2

Tournament results

References

External links
 

2006 American television series debuts
2007 American television series endings
Television shows about blackjack
CBS original programming